Mrinal Dutt is an Indian actor and model who primarily works in  Hindi films and Hindi television along with web shows. He made his acting debut with Roomies in 2009 and had his breakthrough with Private Investigator. He made his film debut with Tuneega Tuneega in 2012. Dutt hosted Yeh Hai Aashiqui in 2016.

Dutt made his web debut in 2018 with 13 Mussoorie and has been part of many web shows including Hello Mini, His Storyy and Khwabon Ke Parindey. Dutt has also appeared in short films, 55 km/sec and The Lonely Prince.

Early life
Dutt was born and brought up in Delhi. He completed his graduation from Zakir Hussain College, University of Delhi.

Career 
Dutt started his acting career with small roles in South Indian films like Telugu film Tuneega Tuneega in 2012. In 2013, he played the role of Vikrant in the teenage drama series MTV Webbed, which was produced by Balaji Telefilms. The following year in 2014, he received his first lead role in the series Private Investigator. In character of Raffe Roy Choudhary, Dutt was a college-going teenager who helped a police inspector (played by Vrajesh Hirjee) to solve crimes. He would solve crimes by his keen observation of people and based on Sourabh Ratnu's advice, who had conceptualized the show, Dutt travelled to many common places simply to study and observe mannerisms and behaviour of people. Dutt had himself styled his character, making him look younger, by wearing t-shirts and losing muscle weight by running and playing badminton. Media had speculated that his appearance in the show, especially hair, had been inspired from Benedict Cumberbatch; Dutt called it "just a coincidence, and a good one."

In 2015, Dutt appeared in various episodic roles of Season 3 of the relationship-based show Yeh Hai Aashiqui on Bindass channel. In season 4, the show which was aired weekly, changed to a daily show and Dutt took on the role of host. In 2017, he featured in the short-film A Moment that was conceptualized by him and the director Rohit James. The short-film had featured in Brooklyn Film Festival. In 2019, he played the side role in the web series Coldd Lassi Aur Chicken Masala which was produced by ALTBalaji and directed by Pradeep Sarkar. The story revolved around the romantically complex relationship of two chefs who were married earlier. Dutt's role was of a playboy lover who was dating sous chef played by Madhu Sneha. 

From 2019 onwards, Dutt featured in three seasons of romantic-thriller web series Hello Mini streaming on MX Player. The series is based on The Stranger Trilogy written by Novoneel Chakraborty. Dutt plays the love interest of the titular character (Rivanah Bannerjee) played by Anuja Joshi.

In 2020, Dutt featured in a short sci-fi film titled 55 km/sec, directed by Arati Kadav. The plot is about a loner man Sooraj (played by Dutt) in a world awaiting doomsday as an asteroid is about to hit the earth. His college friends arrange a video call where he sees Srishti (played by Richa Chadda), his long-time crush and he confesses his love, unafraid of any consequences. Due to COVID-19 lockdown in India, the film was directed remotely where the lead actors Dutt and Chadda had to set up their own frames using their own devices for the shooting. The film was released on Hotstar and Amazon Prime.<ref>{{cite web | url=https://www.outlookindia.com/newsscroll/arati-kadavs-short-film-55-kmsec-to-release-on-disney-hotstar-on-jan-20/2013284 | title=Arati Kadavs short film 55 km/sec to release on Disney+ Hotstar on Jan 20 | work=Outlook | date=19 January 2021 | accessdate=14 May 2021}}</ref>

In 2021, he played the role of Preet, a homosexual man in love with a married man (played by Satyadeep Mishra), in the web series His Storyy. Dutt claimed that he found the role challenging and was excited about it. In June 2021, his web series Khwabon Ke Parindey'' aired on Voot which starred Asha Negi and Manasi Moghe. Dutt played role of Dixit, who is set on a road trip with his friends from Melbourne to Perth. The series was shot at 12 different locations in Australia within 40 days.

Filmography

Films

Television

Web series

Music videos

References

External links 

Indian film actors
Male actors in Hindi television
Male actors from Delhi
1980s births
Living people

Year of birth uncertain